Les Fonts is a town in Vallès Occidental, province of Barcelona, Catalonia, Spain

Les Fonts may also refer to:

 Les Fonts (Barcelona–Vallès Line) railway station at Les Fonts
 Les Fonts del Cardener, in the municipality of La Coma i la Pedra, Solsonès, Catalonia, Spain, source of the Cardener river

See also
Saint-Paul-les-Fonts, a commune in the Gard department in southern France
Sant Joan les Fonts, a municipality of the comarca of Garrotxa, located in Girona, Catalonia, Spain